The Seasons is a Canadian short documentary film, directed by Christopher Chapman and released in 1954. Set to Antonio Vivaldi's The Four Seasons, the film depicts the cycle of the seasons throughout a year on the grounds of his parents' farm on the shore of Lake Simcoe.

The film won the Canadian Film Award for Film of the Year at the 6th Canadian Screen Awards.

Following Chapman's death in 2015, a public sculpture inspired by and named in honour of The Seasons was installed on the grounds of the ReachView Village seniors home in Uxbridge, Ontario, where Chapman had lived in his final years.

References

External links

1954 films
1954 documentary films
Canadian short documentary films
English-language Canadian films
Films shot in Ontario
Best Picture Genie and Canadian Screen Award winners
1950s short documentary films
1950s Canadian films